Prosna  is a village in the administrative district of Gmina Korsze, within Kętrzyn County, Warmian-Masurian Voivodeship, in northern Poland.

The village was first mentioned in 1376 by Winrich von Kniprode as property of the Leunenburg family. In 1490 Barbara von Leunenburg married Botho von Eulenburg and the village from then on remained the property of the von Eulenburg family until 1945.
The manor house was initially built in 1610–1620 and restructured by the Polish brethren Jan Josef Gozdawa Naronowicz-Naronski in 1667–68. A last major reconstruction happened in the 1860s in Neogothic style; the tower was added in 1875. The manor was not destroyed throughout World War II but is ruined today.

The village has a population of 277.

References

Villages in Kętrzyn County